Portrait of a Spy is a 2011 spy novel by Daniel Silva. It is the eleventh title in the Gabriel Allon series.

Other than the traditional recurring characters, Portrait features the return of Sarah Bancroft and Nadia al Bakari, daughter of Zizi al Bakari who was Allon's foe in The Messenger.

Like others in Silva's Allon series, Portrait of a Spy is a New York Times bestseller. Portrait of a Spy marked Silva's first book with HarperCollins, following his departure from Putnam following the publication of The Rembrandt Affair in 2010.

References

External links

Novels by Daniel Silva
HarperCollins books
2011 American novels